Fourneau is a French surname. Notable people with the surname include:

Ernest Fourneau (1872–1949), French medicinal chemist
Jean-Claude Fourneau (1907–1981), French surrealist painter
Léon Fourneau (1900–?), Belgian middle-distance runner

See also
Furneaux (surname)

French-language surnames